Jamner railway station serves Jamner in Jalgaon district in the Indian state of Maharashtra.

History

The Pachora–Jamner railway line was constructed by Messrs Shapoorji Godbole and Co. of Bombay. The Pachora–Pahur section was opened up in 1918 and the rest of the sections in 1919. On termination of the contracts with the former Great Indian Peninsula Railway Company, the line was brought under direct State management with effect from 1 July 1925.

This is a narrow-gauge (2ft 6in) line with a length of 34.62 miles. It passes through more or less plain countryside with banana orchards at many a place.

Service
The Pachora–Jamner Passenger is a train that comes under Bhusawal railway division of Indian Railways.

See also
Jamner
Jamner Municipal Council

References

External links
 Indian Rail Info - Trains from Jamner

Railway stations in Jalgaon district
Railway junction stations in India
Bhusawal railway division